Alfredo Tartarini (Bologna 1845 – Bologna 1905) was an Italian painter, depicting frescoes and decorative subjects.

Bologna
He was a pupil of Salvatore Tomaselli and Tito Azzolini at the Accademia of Fine Arts of Bologna. In 1887 and 1880, he won the premio Curlandese for perspective painting. He collaborated with Alfonso Rubbiani in the decoration of the Palazzo della Mercanzia, and in paintings for the churches of San Francesco and San Petronio in Bologna. He curated the 1903 entries to the Emilian section of the Biennale di Venezia. 
 He was active in a stilo Liberty.

References

19th-century Italian painters
20th-century Italian painters
Italian male painters
Painters from Bologna
1845 births
1905 deaths
19th-century Italian male artists
20th-century Italian male artists